Samuel Alpe (29 March 1834 – 30 July 1918) was a New Zealand cricketer. He played first-class cricket for Auckland, Canterbury and Wellington between 1873 and 1885 .

See also
 List of Auckland representative cricketers

References

External links
 

1834 births
1918 deaths
New Zealand cricketers
Auckland cricketers
Canterbury cricketers
Wellington cricketers
People from Swaffham
Sportspeople from Norfolk
British emigrants to New Zealand